"The Wind-Up Doll" is a poem by Forough Farrokhzad (1934 – 1967). It was translated into English in A Rebirth: Poems, translated by David Martin, with a critical essay by Farzaneh Milani (Mazda Publishers, Lexington Ky., 1985) .

Analysis 

Farrokhzad's poems express the environment in which she lived. “The Wind-Up Doll,” written in the time of the Pahlavi kings, conveys the psychological frustrations of women in a restrictive time where women were treated like objects and are suppressed. At the end of the poem, the speaker sarcastically says, “Ah, so happy am I!” At that time, the monarch determined the conditions for women. For example, once he ordered prohibiting the use of the chador by women in public in 1935 even though society still had traditional views regarding women. In the poem "The Wind Up Doll", Farrokhzad challenges the restrictive role of Iranian women and presents the thoughts and emotions of women seeking greater respect and rights.

About the author
Farrokhzad was one of the most influential Persian poets and is still the voice of women in Iran. She began composing poetry when she was 13 or 14. She married a man who was much older than her when she was 16 and divorced her husband soon after. Many of her poems focused on feminism and have remained important and significant long after. Farrokhzad's obsession with  society made her protest against the existing standards of living and that is why her poems have been banned since revolution of Iran in 1979. She was one of the first female poets who protested against inequality between genders and broke taboos in Iran. She died tragically in a car accident when she was only 32.

References

External links

 Another website containing her poems in English
 Iran Chamber's Article on Forugh
 Farrukhzad, Forugh, a biography by Professor Iraj Bashiri, University of Minnesota
 Another Birth Forough's poem translated by A.Z. Foreman
 Terrestrial Verses Forough's poem translated by Mohammad Rajabpur
 Iranian.com audio archive of her poems, Listen to some of her poems by her own voice
 Forough Farrokhzad's Resume
 Interview with Simin Behbahani on the occasion of the fortieth anniversary of Forugh Farrokhzad's death on Thursday 13 February 2007 (BBC Persian)
 Forugh Farrokhzad's poem Reborn as translated and said by Sholeh Wolpé
 (website about her)

20th-century poems